Jordan Northcott (born 9 February 2002) is a Scottish professional footballer who plays as a forward for Brechin City.

Career
Having come through St Johnstone's academy, He made his debut for St Johnstone on 3 April 2019 as a late substitute in a 2–0 win over Dundee. In October 2019, Northcott joined BSC Glasgow on loan until January 2020.

Northcott was loaned to Forfar Athletic in March 2021. On 28 February 2022, Northcott joined Highland League side Brechin City on loan for the remainder of the 2021–22 season.

On 12 June 2022, Northcott signed for Brechin on a permanent deal.

References

2002 births
Living people
Scottish footballers
St Johnstone F.C. players
Brechin City F.C. players
Scottish Professional Football League players
Association football forwards
Place of birth missing (living people)
Forfar Athletic F.C. players
Highland Football League players